Estádio do Textáfrica is a multi-purpose stadium in Chimoio, Mozambique.  It is currently used mostly for football matches and is the home stadium of Textáfrica do Chimoio.  The stadium holds 5,000 people.  

Textafrica do Chimoio
Multi-purpose stadiums in Mozambique
Buildings and structures in Manica Province